Eduardo Avelino Magaña Portillo (born 10 March 1984) is a Mexican archer.

Magaña competed at the 2004 Summer Olympics. In the men's individual event, he was defeated in the first round of elimination, placing 49th overall. Magaña was also a member of the 12th-place Mexican men's archery team.

References

External links
 

1984 births
Living people
Mexican male archers
Archers at the 2004 Summer Olympics
Olympic archers of Mexico
Sportspeople from Mérida, Yucatán